Buciumi may refer to several places in Romania:

 Buciumi, Bacău, a commune in Bacău County
 Buciumi, Sălaj, a commune in Sălaj County
 Buciumi, a village in Șomcuta Mare town, Maramureș County
Buciumi (river), a tributary of the Cașin in Bacău County